The 2017 Women's World Open Squash Championship is the 2017 women's edition of the World Championships, which serves as the individual world championship for squash players.

The event was held alongside the Men's World Squash Championship between 9 and 17 December 2017 inclusive. Raneem El Weleily defeated fellow Egyptian and the defending champion Nour El Sherbini in the final.

Seeds

Draw and results

See also
2017 Men's World Squash Championship

References

World Squash Championships
Women's World Open Squash Championship
International sports competitions hosted by England
2017 in English sport
2017 in English women's sport
2017 in women's squash
Squash in England